Palackal may refer to:

Palackal Thoma ( 1780–1841), Indian Catholic priest, founder of the Carmelites of Mary Immaculate
Joseph J. Palackal, Indic musicologist, singer, and composer